Chesty XIV was the mascot of the United States Marine Corps from 2013 to 2018. A male English Bulldog, he was named after Chesty Puller.

See also
 Jiggs II
 List of individual dogs

References

|-

|-

United States Marine Corps lore and symbols
Military animals
Individual dogs in the United States
American mascots